Upon Reflection is a solo album by English saxophonist John Surman recorded in 1979 and released on the ECM label.

Reception
The Allmusic review by Scott Yanow awarded the album 4½ stars, calling it "an atmospheric solo set that utilizes overdubbing (although leaving space for unaccompanied solo sections)... Fortunately there is enough variety in this generally quiet music to hold one's interest".

Track listing
All compositions by John Surman.

 "Edges of Illusion" – 10:10   
 "Filigree" – 3:41   
 "Caithness to Kerry" – 3:51   
 "Beyond a Shadow" – 6:40   
 "Prelude and Rustic Dance" – 5:14   
 "The Lamplighter" – 6:19   
 "Following Behind" – 1:24   
 "Constellation" – 8:16

Personnel
John Surman – soprano saxophone, baritone saxophone, bass clarinet, synthesizer

References

ECM Records albums
John Surman albums
1979 albums
Albums produced by Manfred Eicher